Juan Carlos Burbano de Lara Torres  (born 15 February 1969) is a former Ecuadorian footballer who is the interim manager of El Nacional in Quito.

Club career
Burbano played for a few clubs, including Deportivo Quito and El Nacional.

International career
Burbano made 18 appearances for the senior Ecuador national football team from 1996 to 2002, and was a participant at the 2002 FIFA World Cup.

Career as manager
Burbano was appointed interim manager of El Nacional following the dismissal of Jorge Célico at the start of the 2009 season.

References

External links

1969 births
Living people
Footballers from Quito
Association football midfielders
Ecuadorian footballers
Ecuador international footballers
2002 FIFA World Cup players
1997 Copa América players
2001 Copa América players
C.D. Universidad Católica del Ecuador footballers
S.D. Quito footballers
C.D. El Nacional footballers
C.D. El Nacional managers